The Salmson-Béchereau SB-2 was a trainer aircraft built by the French company Salmson.

The SB-2 was basically a mid-wing monoplane design. Only one aircraft was built.

Specifications

References

Trainer aircraft
SB
Single-engined tractor aircraft